The first season of the action-adventure series MacGyver premiered on September 23, 2016, on CBS, for the 2016–17 American television season. The series centers on the fictional Phoenix Foundation which is a covert organization masquerading as a think tank. The series stars Lucas Till, George Eads, Tristin Mays, and Justin Hires. Sandrine Holt was also cast in the series but departed in  the twelfth episode, "Screwdriver". Meredith Eaton replaced Holt, Eaton debuted in the thirteenth episode, "Large Blade," and began receiving main billing in the eighteenth episode, "Flashlight". CBS announced the series on October 1, 2015. It was ordered to series on May 13, 2016, and received a full season order of twenty-two episodes on October 17, 2016. Only twenty-one episodes were produced when the season concluded on April 14, 2017. The season contained a fictional crossover with Hawaii Five-0 which occurred in episode eighteen.

The first season ranked number 27 for the 2016–17 television season, had an average of 9.8 million viewers, and received mostly negative reviews. "The Rising", the series premiere, brought in the most viewers for the season with 10.9 million; meanwhile, the season finale, "Cigar Cutter" brought in 6.57 million. The series was renewed for a second season on March 23, 2017, which later premiered on September 29.

Cast and characters

Main
 Lucas Till as Angus "Mac" MacGyver
 George Eads as Jack Dalton
 Sandrine Holt as Patricia Thorton
 Tristin Mays as Riley Davis
 Justin Hires as Wilt Bozer
 Meredith Eaton as Matilda "Matty" Webber

Recurring
 Tracy Spiridakos as Nikki Carpenter

Guest

 Daniel Dae Kim as Lieutenant Chin Ho Kelly: Crossover character from Hawaii Five-0. A member of the Five-0 Task Force.
 Grace Park as Officer Kono Kalakaua: Crossover character from Hawaii Five-0. A member of the Five-0 Task Force.
 Taylor Wily as Kamekona Tupuola: Crossover character from Hawaii Five-0. An entrepreneur and confidential informant for the Five-0 Task Force.

Episodes

The number in the "No. overall" column refers to the episode's number within the overall series, whereas the number in the "No. in season" column refers to the episode's number within this particular season. The titles of each episode, with the exception of the pilot, are named after a tool on MacGyver's Swiss Army knife. "U.S. viewers (millions)" refers to the number of viewers in the U.S. in millions who watched the episode as it was aired.

Crossover
The fifteenth episode of the season, "Magnifying Glass", placed the series in the same fictional universe as Hawaii Five-0 when the fictional Five-0 Task Force and multiple characters were mentioned. The eighteenth episode, "Flashlight" featured guest appearances by Hawaii Five-0 actors Daniel Dae Kim, Grace Park, and Taylor Wily as Lieutenant Chin Ho Kelly, Officer Kono Kalakaua, and Kamekona Tupuola, respectively. The Phoenix Foundation was subsequently mentioned in the Hawaii Five-0 seventh season episode "Puka 'Ana" which aired immediately following "Flashlight".

Production

Development

On October 1, 2015, it was announced that CBS had plans to reboot MacGyver and had reportedly agreed to a put pilot. It was reported that R. Scott Gemmill and James Wan would write and direct the pilot, respectively. Henry Winkler, along with Gemmill and Wan were also set to executive produce the series. Wan pulled from directing in March 2016 due to scheduling conflicts, David Von Ancken was announced as the new director while Wan remained as executive producer of the series. It was also reported that Gemmill had backed from the series all together, Paul Downs Colaizzo and Brett Mahoney were announced as the new writers. In addition, Ancken, Michael Clear, Colaizzo, Mahony, as well as original series creator Lee David Zlotoff all signed on as executive producers. On May 13, 2016, it was reported that CBS had given a series order for MacGyver. It was later announced in June 2016 that the original pilot idea had been scrapped; the series was recast and Peter M. Lenkov, who also developed the 2010 reboot of Hawaii Five-O for the network, had signed on to "revamp" the series. As part of the revamp Ancken was also pulled from the series and James Wan was once again announced as the director. Lenkov was also announced to be taking over as showrunner of the series. Lionsgate Television also signed on to produce the series along with CBS Television Studios. When CBS revealed its fall schedule it was revealed that the series would premiere on September 23, 2016. On October 17, 2016, the series was given a full series order of twenty-two episodes but only twenty-one were produced. On March 23, 2017, CBS renewed the series for a second season and the first season concluded April 14, 2017.

Filming
Possible filming locations for the pilot originally included Portland, Oregon. Ultimately the pilot was filmed in Los Angeles, California. Following production of the pilot production moved to Atlanta, Georgia, filming at Mailing Avenue Stageworks in Chosewood Park. Portions of the episode "Flashlight" was filmed in Oahu, Hawaii, on the set of Hawaii Five-0.

Casting
On March 8, 2016, George Eads was the first to be cast as Lincoln. It was revealed on March 21, 2016, that Lucas Till and Joshua Boone had been cast as Angus MacGyver and Gunner, respectively. Later cast were Addison Timlin and Michelle Krusiec as Mickey and Department of Homeland Security Agent Croix. In June 2016 it was announced that the pilot episode was being re-shot and that Eads and Till would be the only cast members to remain. In addition, Eads role was changed to play former CIA Agent Jack Dalton. As part of the recasting of the series Justin Hires was announced to be playing Wilt Bozer. For the reboot, the role of Peter Thornton from the original series was changed to a woman instead named Patricia Thornton, the role went to Sandrine Holt. Last to be cast was Tristin Mays as Riley Davis. Holt departed the series mid season following the twelfth episode. Ahead of the thirteenth episode it was announced that Meredith Eaton had been cast to replace Holt as Matty Webber, Eaton debuted as a guest star and began receiving main billing in episode eighteen. Recurring cast for the season includes Tracy Spiridakos as Nikki Carpenter. Meanwhile, Daniel Dae Kim, Grace Park, and Taylor Wily all appeared in an episode as their respective Hawaii Five-0 characters.

Reception

Critical reception
Rotten Tomatoes, a review aggregator website, gives the series an average rating of 4.11 out of 10 based on thirty-six reviews. Meanwhile, Metacritic, which uses a weighted average, gives the series a 38 based on twenty-six reviews indicating "generally unfavorable reviews". Tyler McCarthy with Den of Geek! stated about the pilot "The MacGyver reboot is the backwards product of nostalgia colliding with modernization". When reviewing both MacGyver and the Lethal Weapon TV adaption Maureen Ryan with Variety said "Lucas Till's performance as the title character misses the mark completely" and that "Both programs seem like broken relics from a time capsule". Daniel Fienberg from The Hollywood Reporter says "Despite a blockbuster director at the helm, it's a shoddy product made out of the sort of ill-fitting bits and bobs that Angus MacGyver himself might fashion into a bomb". Following the season finale Matt Webb Mitovich of TV Line stated "I find the five-person cast a bit claustrophobic, and I’m on record as not being a fan of new boss Matty Webber".

Awards and nominations
As part of the Creative Arts Emmy Awards at the 69th Primetime Creative Arts Emmy Awards, stunt coordinator Jeff Wolfe was nominated for an Emmy Award in "Outstanding Stunt Coordination for a Drama Series, Limited Series, or Movie"; the award was won by James Lew for Marvel's Luke Cage. Keith Power, a composer for the series, received a BMI Award for his work on the series. At the 43rd People's Choice Awards the series as a whole was nominated for a People's Choice Award for Favorite New TV Drama, but the award was won by This Is Us.

Viewing figures

 Live +7 ratings were not available, so Live +3 ratings have been used instead.

Home video release

References

MacGyver
2016 American television seasons
2017 American television seasons